Jeremy Chatelain may refer to:

Jérémy Chatelain (born 1984), French singer
Jeremy Chatelain (album)
Jeremy Chatelain (bassist), bass player of Helmet